Artur Santos may refer to:
Artur Santos (journalist) (1884-1955), Portuguese journalist and politician
Artur Santos (footballer) (born 1931), Portuguese footballer who plays as a defender